Tone Lise Moberg (born 1 April 1970 in Os, Hordaland, Norway) is a Norwegian singer and song teacher.

Biography 
Moberg acquired jazz by writing songs at the piano and doing her own versions of jazz standards. She studied jazz at Guildhall School of Music and Drama, formed several bands, and performed on jazzfestivals and jazzclubs in Norway. She also lived and performed in England for many years as song student of the Leeds City College. She was based in Trondheim for some years while attending the Jazz program at Norwegian University of Science and Technology (NTNU), before settling down in Bergen. Here she studied at the Grieg Academy. Her debut solo album Looking On (2006) was recorded with drummer Stein Inge Brækhus, bassist Torbjørn Hillersøy, keyboarder Eivind Austad, and trumpeter Snorre Farstad.

Discography

Solo albums 
 2006: Looking On (NorCD)

Collaborations 
 With Tore Dimmestøl
 1995: Bird Colony (Origo Sound)

 With Ole Amund Gjersvik
 1998: Milonga Triste (Acoustic Records)	
	
 With Unge Frustrerte Menn
 2001: Dronningen Av Kalde Føtter (Grappa)

References

External links 
 

1971 births
Living people
Norwegian women jazz singers
Norwegian jazz singers
Norwegian jazz composers
21st-century Norwegian singers
21st-century Norwegian women singers
Musicians from Os, Hordaland
NorCD artists
Grappa Music artists